Joël Corminbœuf (born 16 March 1964) is a former association football player who played as a goalkeeper. He was born in Fribourg.

He played for Neuchâtel Xamax (1985-January 1991 and September 1991 – 1993 and 1994–2000) which won two Swiss Premier League in 1987 and 1988, and also for FC Zurich and RC Strasbourg. He finished his career in 2000.

For Switzerland national football team he got 6 international caps in 1988 and was in roster for Euro 1996, but never played a match at the tournament.

Honours
Neuchâtel Xamax
Swiss Super League: 1986–87, 1987–88
Swiss Super Cup: 1987, 1988

References

External links
Profile

1964 births
Living people
Swiss men's footballers
Swiss expatriate footballers
Association football goalkeepers
Swiss Super League players
Neuchâtel Xamax FCS players
RC Strasbourg Alsace players
Ligue 1 players
UEFA Euro 1996 players
FC Zürich players
Switzerland international footballers
Expatriate footballers in France
Swiss expatriate sportspeople in France
People from Fribourg
Sportspeople from the canton of Fribourg